The Delaneys Falls, also named Preston Falls, is a plunge waterfall on Preston Creek. It is located in the North West region of Tasmania, Australia.

Location and features
The falls is signposted as Preston Falls. There is a well kept walking track from the ridge down to the lookout. It's also possible to walk to the base; however there is no formalised track.

See also

 List of waterfalls of Tasmania

References

External links
Delaneys Falls, Tasmania Map at Geodata.us

Waterfalls of Tasmania
North West Tasmania
Plunge waterfalls